Coronadoa is a genus of sea snails, marine gastropod mollusks in the family Scissurellidae, the top snails.

Species
Species within the genus Coronadoa include:
 Coronadoa demisispira Geiger & McLean, 2010
 Coronadoa hasegawai Geiger & Sasaki, 2009
 Coronadoa simonsae Bartsch, 1946

References

 Geiger D.L. (2003) Phylogenetic assessment of characters proposed for the generic classification of Recent Scissurellidae (Gastropoda: Vetigastropoda) with a description of one new genus and six new species from Easter Island and Australia. Molluscan Research 23: 21-83
 Geiger D.L. (2012) Monograph of the little slit shells. Volume 1. Introduction, Scissurellidae. pp. 1-728. Volume 2. Anatomidae, Larocheidae, Depressizonidae, Sutilizonidae, Temnocinclidae. pp. 729–1291. Santa Barbara Museum of Natural History Monographs Number 7.

Scissurellidae
Monotypic gastropod genera